Anfila was a settlement and historic district on the Red Sea coast of present-day Eritrea. Along with the nearby Bay of Zula, it was claimed by Ethiopia in the 19th century. Once used as a port for caravans, the Bay of Anfila is uninhabited.

References

Populated places in Eritrea
Red Sea